The practice of Islam by members of the African diaspora may be a consequence of African Muslims retaining their religion after leaving Africa (as for many Muslims in Europe) or of people of African ethnicity converting to Islam, as among many African-American Muslims, where conversion is often presented as a recovery of an African heritage lost during the Atlantic slave trade. In many regions, African-diaspora Muslims are an intersectional minority, and may face both racism and anti-Islam sentiment.

References

Islam
Diaspora
African diaspora
African diaspora
African diaspora
African diaspora
African diaspora
Religion and race
Afro-American religion
Asian people of African descent
Diaspora
African